The Mission Foods Austin Speedtour (known as the Trans-Am at COTA or Austin Speedtour or COTA Trans Am 100 or Heacock Classic from Trans-Am or The Heacock Classic) called for sponsorship reasons, is a Trans-Am Race that was held for the first time in the 2015 Trans-Am Series at Circuit of the Americas and was added as an expansion to the schedule. The race is usually held on October or November in the Trans-Am Series schedule. The race is scheduled with the Sportscar Vintage Racing Association for the weekend. The West Coast Championship race has been added along the National Championship race since 2017 making Circuit of the Americas one of the tracks to host both events on the same weekend. Circuit of the Americas provided the closest finish in Trans-Am history, it was in the 2018 TA2 race when Gar Robinson passed Misha Goikhberg at the COTA Muscle Car Challenge by .064 seconds. There was another record made when 52 cars field the 2021 COTA TA2 race. The track has been part of two championships clinching races in the TA2 class (2019 & 2021). COTA has hosted once the season finale and that was in 2021. The race is held under The Trans Am Series presented by Pirelli name, it is sanctioned by SCCA Pro Racing owned by Parella Motorsports Holdings (PMH)

Official names and sponsors
 2015–2016: Trans-Am at COTA
 2017: The Trans American Muscle Car Challenge from COTA
 2018: COTA Muscle Car Challenge at Circuit of The Americas
 2019-2020: U.S. Vintage National Championship
 2021–2022: Heacock Classic from Trans-Am (with Austin Speedtour)
 2022-present: Austin Speedtour presented by Mission Foods

Winners of the Austin Speedtour

National Championship 

† Race is held in combination with the Trans Am West Coast Championship

 Unofficial Winner

West Coast Championship 

 Unofficial Winner

References

External links
 

 
Sports Car Club of America
Circuit of the Americas